Para Mi (Spanish meaning “For Me”) is the debut studio album by American singer-songwriter Cuco, released on July 26, 2019, through Interscope Records. The album was co-produced by Cuco and Jonathan Rado of Foxygen. The album touches on recent problems that Cuco has experienced first-hand, including a tour bus accident that sent him and his band to hospital.

Background 
After the release of his fourth extended play, Chiquito, Cuco released several songs and collaborations. In 2018, he collaborated with Clairo on a non-album single called "Drown" as well as with Polyphia on a track called "So Strange" off their album New Levels New Devils. In 2019, he collaborated with his childhood Chicano rap idols MC Magic and Lil Rob on a track called "Search". Cuco signed with Interscope Records in March 2019 after a bidding war that lasted two years. On April 2, 2019, Cuco released the lead single for his album, "Hydrocodone" as well as "Bossa No Sé" featuring Jean Carter on May 22, 2019.

Critical reception 

Para Mi received positive reviews from music critics. At Metacritic, which assigns a normalized rating out of 100 to reviews from mainstream publications, the album received an average score of 68, based on 10 reviews. Mark Richardson of Wall Street Journal deemed the album "charmingly loose and endearingly quirky," while Suzy Exposito of Rolling Stone wrote that Cuco "transmutes various pop methodologies to create his own blend of burnout soul." Hua Hsu from The New Yorker expressed that "Banos's identity comes out, subtly, through language and his affection for tender, tear-jerking soul ballads." Safiya Hopfe from Exclaim! described the album as "rhythmically punchy and melodically smooth" and insisted that Cuco "juggles catchiness and variability without dropping the ball."

Track listing

Personnel 
Credits adapted from the AllMusic webpage on Para Mi.

Performers 

 Cuco – production, vocals, arrangement
 Gabe Baltazar – guitar
 Fernando Carabajal – guitar
 Jean Carter - vocals, arrangement
 Julian Farias - drums
 Esai Salas - bass
 Suscat0 - vocals
 Mauria Tapia - drums

Production and recording 

 Cuco - mixing, producer
 Jonathan Rado - engineer, producer
 Lars Stalfors - mastering, mixing
 Nicholas Ladron De Guevara - engineer
 Anthony Dolhai - mixing
 Steven Martinez - arrangement
 Tristan Friedberg Rodman - assistant engineer
 David Rodriguez - arrangement

Charts

References

2019 debut albums
Interscope Records albums
Albums produced by Jonathan Rado